Thomas C. Creighton (February 19, 1945 – July 24, 2022) was a Republican Party member of the Pennsylvania House of Representatives for the 37th District, serving from 2001 through 2013.

Career
Creighton held a number of positions prior to his political career, including a plant engineer/manager for Kellogg Company a research engineer for the National Bureau of Standards and a research scientist for Armstrong World Industries.  Creighton has also been an instructor at Indiana University of Pennsylvania and a science teacher in the Altoona Area School District.  His prior elected offices include Judge of Elections and Township Supervisor in Rapho Township, Pennsylvania.

Creighton was elected in 2000 to replace Katie True, who retired from the House in order to run for Pennsylvania Auditor General.  He was re-elected three times.

Creighton sat on the House Commerce, Judiciary, and State Government committees.

Personal
Creighton was a resident of Rapho Township, Pennsylvania, in Lancaster County.  He earned a B.S. degree in physics from Juniata College and a master's degree in physics and mathematics from Indiana University of Pennsylvania. He died on July 24, 2022 at the age of 77.

References

External links
Representative Creighton official web site
Profile at the Pennsylvania House

1945 births
2022 deaths
Republican Party members of the Pennsylvania House of Representatives
Politicians from Altoona, Pennsylvania
People from Lancaster County, Pennsylvania